Madame Aema 3 is a 1985 South Korean film directed by Jeong In-yeob. It was the second sequel to Madame Aema (1982), and part of the longest-running film series in Korean cinema.

Plot
Aema is married to a Professor Noh in this entry in the Aema Buin series. Professor Noh has become obsessed with sex through his research and wild experiences abroad. Consequently, he is dissatisfied with Aema. Aema has an affair with a professional wrestler who resembles her first boyfriend, then seeks forgiveness from her husband. When their reconciliation proves a failure, Aema wanders the streets in despair.

Cast
 Kim Bu-seon: Aema
 Lee Jung-gil
 Jang Seung-hwa
 Jin Bong-jin
 Park Won-sook
 O Hye-min
 Kim Chin-tai
 Choi Jong-won
 Jo Yong-gwon
 Kim Uk

Bibliography

English

Korean

Notes

Madame Aema
1985 films
1980s erotic films
1980s Korean-language films
South Korean sequel films